C. rosea may refer to:
 Canavalia rosea, the beach bean, bay bean, seaside bean, coastal jackbean or MacKenzie bean, a plant species
 Caragana rosea, a plant species in the genus Caragana
 Ceiba rosea, a plant species found in Colombia, Costa Rica and Panama
 Cistanthe rosea, a flowering plant species
 Clonostachys rosea f. rosea, a fungus species
 Coreopsis rosea, the tickseed, a plant species in the family Asteraceae
 Cylindropuntia rosea, the Hudson pear, a cactus species native to Arizona and Mexico

Synonyms
 Clusia rosea, a synonym for Clusia major, a tree species
 Conchocelis rosea, a synonym for the Porphyra alga

See also
 Rosea (disambiguation)